The Sơn Mỹ Memorial is a memorial to victims of the My Lai Massacre in Son My, Vietnam. This monument was sculpted and donated by Vietnamese artist Ho Thu, husband of Vo Thi Lien who was one of the few survivors of this atrocity. She was only 13 years old at the time. 
 
The Sơn Mỹ Memorial monument is located in the village of Tịnh Khê, Sơn Tịnh District, Quảng Ngãi Province. U.S. soldiers killed between 347 and 504 Vietnamese in this area on 16 March 1968. The memorial was built in 1978. At the time of the massacre, Sơn Mỹ was a village that included Mỹ Lai and several other hamlets. Because Mỹ Lai was not the only hamlet involved, the Vietnamese media refers to the event as the "Sơn Mỹ massacre".

Sơn Mỹ was divided into four hamlets: Mỹ Lai, Co Luy, My Khe, and Tư Cung. The U.S. Army designated the various sectors of each hamlet in the form My Lai (1), My Lai (2), etc. The massacre took place, most notably in My Lai (4) (Xom Lang subhamlet) and in My Khe (4) (My Hoi subhamlet), but also in My Lai (5) (Binh Dong and Binh Tay subhamlets) and in Tư Cung.

The memorial is in the former hamlet of Tư Cung. In 2003, the Ministry of Culture, Sports and Tourism announced an 11.7 billion đồng contract to upgrade the building.

References

External links
 Footprints at My Lai Traveler's report about visiting Sơn Mỹ Memorial
 Hoi An to My Lai Massacre 1 Day Experience

Buildings and structures in Quảng Ngãi province
Vietnam War sites
Monuments and memorials in Vietnam